Gopalpur (Hindi/Bengali/Oriya) or Gopalapuram (Telugu/Tamil/Malayalam) may refer to:

Bangladesh
 Gopalpur Upazila, a  sub-district of Tangail District, Dhaka Division
 Gopalpur, Tangail, Bangladesh, a town which is the seat of that sub-district (upazila)
 Gopalpur, Lalpur Upazila, a village which is the seat of Lalpur Upazila, a sub-district (upazila) of Natore District, Rajshahi Division
 See also the Gopalpur massacre by the Pakistan Army during the Bangladesh liberation war of 1971
 Several villages in Jhalokati District, Barisal Division:
 Gopalpur, Jhalakati
 Pār Gopālpur
 Chhota Gopālpur
 Gopalpur, Pirojpur, a village in Pirojpur District, Barisal Division

India
 in Andrha Pradesh state:
 Gopalapuram, West Godavari, a village and a Grama Panchayat in West Godavari district
 Dandu Gopalapuram, a village and a Grama Panchayat in Santha Bommali mandal, Srikakulam district
 in Bihar state:
 Gopalpur, Gopalganj, a village in Gopalganj district
 Gopalpur, Bihar Assembly constituency
 in Himachal Pradesh state:
 Gopalpur, Himachal Pradesh, a village in Kangra district
 in Karnataka state:
 Gopalpur, Yadgir, a village in Yadgir taluk, Yadgir district
 in Odisha state:
 Gopalpur, Odisha, a town and a notified area council in cuttack district (southern part of the state)
 Gopalpur, Odisha Assembly constituency
 in Tamil Nadu state:
 Gopalapuram, Chennai, a village in Chennai district
 Gopalapuram, Thanjavur, a village in Thanjavur district
 in Telangana state:
 Gopalpur, Karimnagar
 in Uttar Pradesh state:
 Gopalpur, Uttar Pradesh Assembly constituency
 in West Bengal state:
 Gopalpur, Nadia, a census town in Ranaghat subdivision, Nadia district
 Gopalpur, Paschim Bardhaman, a census town in Durgapur subdivision, in Paschim Bardhaman district
 Gopalpur, Chanditala-I, a village in Srirampore subdivision, in Hooghly district
 Gopalpur, Dakshin Dinajpur, a census town in Gangrampur subdivision, in Dakshin Dinajpur district

Nepal
 Gopalpur, Nepal, a village development committee in  Dhanusa district, Janakpur zone, Central region, Nepal

People
 Gopalapuram Parthasarathy, an Indian diplomat and author